Sky Link TV (Chinese: 天下衛視; pinyin: Tiān Xià Wèi Shì) is Chinese satellite TV network in the United States owned by Guangzhou Broadcasting Network.

History
In 1989, a Taiwanese American financial group founded North America Television (NATV) in Los Angeles. California. In 2009, it was purchased by a private Chinese company, Tian Xing Media Company. In 2013, it was purchased by a subsidiary of Guangzhou Broadcasting Network, GZ Television Media.

Jetsen Huashi Wangju Media & Sky Link TV Merger 
On March 22, 2019, Jetsen Huashi Wangju Cultural Media Company announced a merger with Sky Link TV USA.

Timeline of events 
 December 1, 1989 - North America Television (NATV) was founded in Los Angeles, California.  
 1990 - North America Television entered Charter Cable.
 December, 1992 - North America Television started branch company in New York City.  It entered Time Warner Cable in New York City.
 1999, North America Television closed New York branch company.
 December, 2001 - North America Television changed its name to Global Communication Group, Inc. started doing business as Sky Link TV.  
 January 1, 2004 - Sky Link TV began live broadcast Rose Parade at every New Year's Day in Mandarin.
 August 10, 2006 - Sky Link TV joined Dish Network channel.
 November 9, 2007 - Sky Link TV joined Kylin internet TV channel.
 July 27, 2009 - Sky Link TV was sold to Tian Xing Media Company from China.
 December, 2009 - Sky Link TV launched its first free-to-air channel KVMD, UHF 31.5 for 24/7 Mandarin programs. 
 September 17, 2012 - Sky Link TV was sold to Guangzhou Media American Co, Ltd.  
 November 2, 2012 - Sky Link TV launched its second free-to-air channel: a brand new Cantonese TV Channel (KXLA UHF 44.4), thus became the first TV Station broadcast in both Mandarin and Cantonese in the United States 24/7.
 November 4, 2012 - Sky Link TV hosted Dayo Wong stand-up comedy show at Pasadena Civic Auditorium in Los Angeles.
 January 1, 2013 -  Sky Link TV began to live broadcast Rose Parade in Cantonese and Mandarin language.
 May 15, 2014 - Sky Link TV launched its third channel (KXLA UHF 44.3) in Mandarin.  Meanwhile, Sky Link TV ends its affiliation with KVMD 31.5.
 November 16, 2014 - Sky Link TV hosted another Dayo Wong stand-up comedy show in New York City, San Francisco, and Los Angeles.
 May 2015 - Sky Link TV ended Kylin TV internet TV streaming.
 September 18, 2015 - Sky Link TV signs an agreement with KRON-TV.
 September 29, 2015 - Sky Link TV SF goes on the air via KRON 4.2 and Comcast Xfinity channel 193.
December 6, 2018 - Sky Link TV Names Nielsen New Local Television Measurement Provider
March 22, 2019 - Jetsen Huashi Wangju Media & Sky Link TV Merger and Acquisition

References

External links
 

Television stations in the San Francisco Bay Area
Television channels and stations established in 1989
Television stations in Los Angeles
State media
Government-owned companies of China